Afropsipyla pictella is a species of snout moth in the genus Afropsipyla. It was described by Boris Balinsky in 1994 and is known from Namibia (it was described from Abachaus) and South Africa.

References

Moths described in 1994
Phycitinae
Moths of Africa